1777 Gehrels, also designated , is a stony asteroid from the middle region of the asteroid belt, approximately 13 kilometers in diameter. It was discovered during the Palomar–Leiden survey in 1960, and named for astronomer Tom Gehrels, one of the survey's principal investigators and credited discoverer.

Discovery 

Gehrels was discovered during the Palomar–Leiden survey by the Dutch astronomer couple Ingrid and Cornelis van Houten, in collaboration with Dutch–American astronomer Tom Gehrels at Palomar Observatory, California, on 24 September 1960.

The survey designation "P-L" stands for Palomar–Leiden, named after Palomar and Leiden Observatory, which collaborated on the fruitful Palomar–Leiden survey in the 1960s. Gehrels used Palomar's Samuel Oschin telescope (also known as the 48-inch Schmidt Telescope), and shipped the photographic plates to Ingrid and Cornelis van Houten at Leiden Observatory, where astrometry was carried out. The trio are credited with the discovery of several thousand minor planets.

Orbit and classification 

It orbits the Sun in the central main-belt at a distance of 2.6–2.7 AU once every 4 years and 3 months (1,554 days). Its orbit has an eccentricity of 0.02 and an inclination of 3° with respect to the ecliptic.

Physical characteristics 

This S-type asteroid is characterized as a transitional Sq-type in the SMASS classification.

Diameter and albedo 

According to the survey carried out by NASA's Wide-field Infrared Survey Explorer (WISE) with its subsequent NEOWISE mission, Gehrels measures between 11.860 and 13.14 kilometers in diameter and its surface has an albedo between 0.2212 and 0.277.

The Collaborative Asteroid Lightcurve Link adopts Petr Pravec's revised WISE-data and takes an albedo of 0.2151 with a diameter of 12.67 kilometers based on an absolute magnitude of 11.773.

Lightcurves 

Several rotational lightcurve of Gehrels were obtained from photometric observations by astronomers Wiesław Wiśniewski, Petr Pravec, Pierre Antonini, Raoul Behrend, Donn Starkey, Laurent Bernasconi, Jacques Montier, Serge Heterier, Daniel Klinglesmith and Robert Stephens. Lightcurve analysis gave a rotation period between 2.83 and 2.840 hours with a brightness variation of 0.21 and 0.27 magnitude.

Naming 

This minor planet was named in honor of Dutch-born American astronomer Tom Gehrels (1925–2011), professor at the University of Arizona, staff member of the LPL research center at Tucson, a principal investigator in the Pioneer program, receiver of the Masursky Award, initiator of the Spacewatch project, and co-discoverer of thousands of minor planets in the Palomar–Leiden survey (see above). He was a pioneer in the field of photometric and polarimetric observations of Solar System bodies in the 1950s. The official  was published by the Minor Planet Center on 25 September 1971.

Notes

References

External links 
 Lightcurve plot of 1777 Gehrels, Palmer Divide Observatory, B. D. Warner (2005)
 Asteroid Lightcurve Database (LCDB), query form (info )
 Dictionary of Minor Planet Names, Google books
 Asteroids and comets rotation curves, CdR – Observatoire de Genève, Raoul Behrend
 Discovery Circumstances: Numbered Minor Planets (1)-(5000) – Minor Planet Center
 
 

001777
4007
Discoveries by Tom Gehrels
Discoveries by Cornelis Johannes van Houten
Discoveries by Ingrid van Houten-Groeneveld
Named minor planets
001777
19600924